Choe Jong-sop (born 27 May 1960) is a North Korean weightlifter. He competed in the men's bantamweight event at the 1980 Summer Olympics.

References

1960 births
Living people
North Korean male weightlifters
Olympic weightlifters of North Korea
Weightlifters at the 1980 Summer Olympics
Place of birth missing (living people)
20th-century North Korean people